Amanda Craig (born 1959) is a British novelist, critic and journalist. She was a recipient of the Catherine Pakenham Award.

Early life
Born in South Africa, Craig grew up in Italy before moving to London. Her parents were British journalist, author and UN Press Officer Dennis Craig, and South African journalist Zelda Wolhuter, who left Johannesburg following the Sharpeville Massacre and the rise of apartheid. Craig studied at Bedales School and read English Literature at Clare College, Cambridge. After graduation, she worked briefly in advertising for J. Walter Thompson and Terence Conran before becoming a journalist and novelist.

Writing
Journalism
For ten years, she was the children's books critic for The Times. She has contributed to The Observer, The Guardian, the New Statesman and BBC Radio 4. As a journalist, Craig won the British Press Awards 1995 Young Journalist of the Year and the 1997 Catherine Pakenham Award. She worked on the staff of Tatler and the Sunday Express before becoming a freelance feature writer, literary critic and columnist for The Daily Telegraph, The Sunday Times, the Daily Mail, The Independent, and The Observer. She had judged numerous literary prizes including the Whitbread Novel Award in 2005, the Booktrust Teen Book Award in 2008, and the 2018 Wingate Prize. Craig was dropped as a judge for the Mslexia Fiction & Memoir Competition by women’s writing magazine Mslexia in September 2020 after she signed a letter to The Times condemning online abuse of J.K. Rowling.

Novels
Craig has written a cycle of eight interconnected novels dealing with contemporary British society, often in an expansive, dramatic and satirical manner that has made her a leading proponent of the social novel. Her multi-stranded approach to writing fiction has been compared to that of Anthony Trollope, Honoré de Balzac, and Charles Dickens.

Her 1996 novel A Vicious Circle was originally contracted to be published by Hamish Hamilton, but was cancelled when its proof copy received a libel threat from David Sexton, literary editor of the Evening Standard and former boyfriend of Craig's at Cambridge, fifteen years previously. The novel was promptly bought by Fourth Estate and published three months later. A Vicious Circle was praised by the critic A.N. Wilson in the Evening Standard as, "A love story and political comment, a defence of the art of fiction, a masterpiece".

Although each novel can be read separately, they are linked to each other by common characters and themes, thus constituting a novel sequence. Craig has been cited as a state-of-the-nation novelist by Sameer Rahim in Prospect and by The Sunday Times. Usually, Craig takes a minor character and makes him or her the protagonist of her next work. She has been praised by A.N. Wilson as "the greatest novelist under fifty", and Allison Pearson in The Sunday Telegraph said: "She has everything you look for in a major writer: wit, indignation, an ear for the telling phrase and an unflagging attention to all the individual choices by which we define ourselves – where we stand as a society and how we decline and fall."

Craig's fourth novel, In a Dark Wood, concerned the interplay between fairytales and manic depression, and her fifth, Love in Idleness, updates Shakespeare's A Midsummer Night's Dream, setting the story in a holiday villa near Cortona, Italy. Her sixth novel, Hearts and Minds, concerned with the lives of legal and illegal immigrants in London, was longlisted for the 2009 Baileys Women's Prize for Fiction.

Her seventh novel, The Lie of the Land (2017), concerned with a London professional couple who can't afford to divorce and move to Devon to a rented house which has been the scene of a murder, was cited as "in the vanguard of the Brexit novel" by Danuta Kean in The Guardian. It was praised by Henry Hitchings in the Financial Times, who commented: "It seems strange that none of Craig's books have been adapted for TV, and the medium is one to which The Lie of the Land would be well suited. An enjoyable, sharp-witted and at times knowingly melodramatic novel, it lives up to the promise of its title – diagnosing the state of the nation without becoming grandiose, and debunking a few quaint myths about the patterns and textures of rural life." It was BBC Radio 4's Book at Bedtime in August 2017. The Guardian chose it as one of the 2017 Books of the Year, as did The Irish Times, The Financial Times, The Observer, and The Telegraph.

Craig has set two of her novels, A Private Place and The Lie of the Land, in Devon, a county that she has compared to C. S. Lewis's Narnia. In an interview with Jackie McGlone of The Glasgow Herald, Craig described how encountering the poverty of North Devon shocked her. Her eighth novel, The Golden Rule was published in 2020 and was widely acclaimed as a "wry comedy-cum-thriller reimagining of Patricia Highsmith Strangers on a Train and Beauty and the Beast", with Craig's skill as a "State of the Nation novelist" depicting a "starkly divided" Britain noted in addition to "offering comfort and wit, compassion and philosophical speculation." The Golden Rule was longlisted for the 2021 Women's Prize for fiction.

Craig is particularly interested in fairytales and children's fiction, and was one of the first critics to praise J. K. Rowling, Philip Pullman, Cressida Cowell, Stephenie Meyer, Anthony Horowitz, Malorie Blackman and Suzanne Collins.

Following her struggle to get A Vicious Circle published, she became an active campaigner with International PEN for the reform of UK libel laws.

In an opinion piece in The Independent, Craig asked why fiction remains obsessed by historical fiction and neglects the contemporary, saying she has "set out to take the DNA of a Victorian novel – its spirit of realism, its strong plot, its cast of characters who are not passively shaped by circumstances but who rise to challenges or escape them." She has said in interviews that she considers writing contemporary fiction to be "a moral duty".

Other
Craig's short stories have been published in Good Housekeeping, The Mail on Sunday, the Sunday Express, the New Statesman and collections such as Valentine's Day Duckworth and Good Housekeeping Great Escapes in support of Childline.

In 2011, she contributed the short story "Red Berries" to an anthology supporting the Woodland Trust. The anthology, Why Willows Weep, has so far helped the Woodland Trust plant approximately 50,000 trees, and was re-released in paperback format in 2016. In 2017 she contributed the short story "Metamorphosis 2" about a celebrity inspired by Katie Hopkins who transforms into a gigantic cockroach to the anthology A Country of Refuge supporting refugees.

Personal life
Craig is married to British economist Rob Cohen, with whom she has two children. She lives in London and Devon.

Bibliography

Books
 
 A Private Place (1991), Hutchinson
 A Vicious Circle (1996), 4th Estate
 In a Dark Wood (2000), 4th Estate
 Love in Idleness (2003), Little, Brown UK 
 Hearts and Minds (2009), Little, Brown UK
 The Other Side of You (novella) (2017), Little, Brown UK
 The Lie of the Land (2017), Little, Brown UK
 The Golden Rule (2020), Little, Brown UK

Book reviews

References

External links
 
 Audio slideshow interview with Amanda Craig on The Interview Online

1959 births
Living people
20th-century British novelists
21st-century British novelists
Children's literature criticism
People educated at Bedales School
Alumni of Clare College, Cambridge
English women novelists
21st-century British short story writers
Fellows of the Royal Society of Literature
English Jewish writers
21st-century English women writers
20th-century English women writers
20th-century English writers
New Statesman people